Karin Iten (11 August 1956 – 18 May 2010) was a Swiss figure skater. She won the bronze medal at the 1973 European Figure Skating Championships. She died on 18 May 2010 in Winterthur from the effects of diabetes. She was among the earliest skaters to perform the Biellmann spin, which was later named after Denise Bielmann, who popularised the spin.

Results

References

External links
 Skatebase: 1970s Europeans Results
 Skatebase: 1970s Worlds Results

1956 births
2010 deaths
Swiss female single skaters
European Figure Skating Championships medalists